The 2013–14 Cal State Fullerton Titans men's basketball team represented California State University, Fullerton during the 2013–14 NCAA Division I men's basketball season. The Titans, led by first year head coach Dedrique Taylor, played their home games at Titan Gym as members of the Big West Conference. The Titans brought in a whole new coaching staff this season with Josh Smith, Robert Spence, and Danny Sprinkle joining Taylor as first-year assistant coaches. They finished the season 11–20, 6–10 in Big West play to finish in a tie for sixth place. They lost in the quarterfinals of the Big West Conference tournament to Long Beach State.

Season

Preseason
Cal State Fullerton announced the hiring of former Arizona State associate head coach Dedrique Taylor as the program's 10th head coach on April 3, 2013. Taylor replaced Andy Newman, who spent one season as the Titans' interim head coach. Taylor had been with Arizona State since 2006, serving as an assistant for four seasons and spending the past three years as an associate head coach. He had spent time as an assistant at UC Davis, Loyola Marymount, Portland State, and Nevada prior.

Taylor completed his first recruiting class as the head man for the Titans on May 8, 2013, with the announcement of the signing of forward Joe Boyd. Boyd, a forward from Scottsdale, Arizona, joined guard Sheldon Blackwell (from Rancho Cucamonga, California) as the second and final member of the Titans' 2013 recruiting class.

The Titans completed their coaching staff on May 17, 2013. All three of Cal State Fullerton's assistants from the season prior had left, and Taylor replaced them with John Smith, Danny Sprinkle, and Robert Spence. Smith, who had spent nine years as the head coach of Riverside City College, joined as an associate head coach, while Sprinkle, an assistant with Cal State Northridge, and Spence, who came over with Taylor as Arizona State's Director of Basketball Operations, joined as assistant coaches.

On August 15, 2013, Taylor welcomed four newcomers to the squad, introducing Dutch freshmen Floris Versteeg and Hiddie Vos, DePaul transfer Moses Morgan, and walk-on Ian Spruce. Morgan, due to NCAA rules, was forced to sit out the 2013–14 season after averaging 6.6 points over three seasons for the Blue Demons. Versteeg, Vos, and Spruce all joined the team as true freshmen with four years of eligibility remaining.

Taylor announced the finalization of the Titans' schedule a day later on August 16. Key games on the Titans' schedule included road games against USC, San Jose State, and UNLV, along with home games against Seattle and Sacramento State. The Titans also scheduled to play in The Wooden Legacy with teams such as Marquette and Miami (FL). The Titans' 16 game conference schedule included one home game and one away game against each of the eight other members of the Big West Conference.

On August 21, 2013, Taylor announced the additions of two more junior college transfers. Taylor received commitments from Riverside City College and former Hampton Pirates guard Corey Walker, and Trinity Valley Community College and former North Dakota guard Josh Gentry. Walker needed to sit out the season due to transfer rules while Gentry was eligible immediately as a junior.

The Titans opened their season with an easy exhibition victory over the University of Redlands, winning 108–77.

Roster

Schedule and results
Source: 

|-
!colspan=9 style="background:#F69F1E; color:#003768;"| Exhibition

|-
!colspan=9 style="background:#F69F1E; color:#003768;"| Non-conference games

|-
!colspan=9 style="background:#F69F1E; color:#003768;"| Conference games

|-
!colspan=9 style="background:#F69F1E; color:#003768;"| Big West tournament

References

Cal State Fullerton Titans men's basketball seasons
Cal State Fullerton
Fullerton Titans
Fullerton Titans